Christopher Lemke (born 14 March 1995) is a German footballer who plays as a midfielder for Ludwigsfelder FC.

Career
Lemke made his professional debut for Energie Cottbus in the 3. Liga on 3 August 2014, coming on as a substitute in the 84th minute for Fanol Perdedaj in the 1–3 home loss against Dynamo Dresden.

References

External links
 
 
 Christopher Lemke at Fussball.de 

1995 births
Living people
Sportspeople from Potsdam
Footballers from Brandenburg
German footballers
Germany youth international footballers
Association football midfielders
FC Energie Cottbus II players
FC Energie Cottbus players
FSV Union Fürstenwalde players
3. Liga players
Regionalliga players